Ángela Fita Boluda (born 12 July 1999) is a Spanish tennis player.

Fita Boluda has a career-high singles ranking by the Women's Tennis Association (WTA) of 253, achieved on 19 September 2022. She also has a career-high WTA doubles ranking of 168, achieved on 29 August 2022.

Up to date, Fita Boluda has won three singles and 19 doubles titles on the ITF Women's Circuit.

ITF finals

Singles: 3 (3 titles)

Doubles: 29 (19 titles, 10 runner–ups)

References

External links

1999 births
Living people
Spanish female tennis players